Dancing with the Stars  returned for a sixth series on 8 January 2023 on RTÉ One.

On 25 August 2022, Nicky Byrne announced that he would be stepping down as host after five seasons to focus on touring commitments with his band, Westlife. On 7 October, Doireann Garrihy was announced as his replacement joining Jennifer Zamparelli as co-host.

This season also saw professional dancer, and two-time reigning champion, Pasquale La Rocca announce his departure from the show as he joined the Italian version of the format, Ballando con le Stelle. On 28 November 2022, all other professional dancers were confirmed to be returning to the series from the previous year, they were joined by new professional dancer, Michael Danilczuk, whom previously that year had finished as runner-up in his native version in Poland, Taniec z gwiazdami.

It was announced on 22 January, due to unforeseen circumstances, professional dancer, Maurizio Benenato had left the show. He was replaced with former Dancing with the Stars Ireland professional and reigning Taniec z gwiazdami champion, Robert Rowiński.

The final on 19 March 2023, was won by Carl Mullan alongside partner Emily Barker.

Couples 
On 1 December 2022, Brooke Scullion, Panti Bliss, Paul Brogan and Suzanne Jackson were announced as the first four celebrities to take part.

Scoring chart 

 Red numbers indicate the couples with the lowest score for each week.
 Green numbers indicate the couples with the highest score for each week.
  the couple eliminated that week
  the returning couple that was called forward and eventually last to be called safe, but was not necessarily in the bottom
  the returning couple that finished in the bottom two and competed in the Dance-Off
  the winning couple
  the two/three runners-up
  the couple was immune from elimination
 "—" indicates the couple(s) did not dance that week

Average chart 
This table only counts for dances scored on a traditional 30-points scale. It does not include the Team Dance or Marathon scores.

Highest and lowest scoring performances 
The highest and lowest performances in each dance according to the judges' scale are as follows.

Couples' highest and lowest scoring dances

Weekly scores and songs 
Unless indicated otherwise, individual judges scores in the charts below (given in parentheses) are listed in this order from left to right: Brian Redmond, Loraine Barry, Arthur Gourounlian.

Week 1
 Running order

Week 2
 Running order

Week 3
 Running order

Week 4: Movie Week
 Running order

Week 5
 Running order

Week 6: Dedicated Dance Week
  Running order
Guest act: Erica-Cody performing her single, 'Cry Baby'.

There was no elimination in Week 6. The judges still scored and the public still voted. However, in a twist, the couple who received the highest combined points was immune from the following week's first Dance-Off, therefore securing their place in the competition until Week 8. The couple granted immunity was Panti & Denys.

{| class="wikitable" style="width:80%;"
!Couples
!Score
!Dance
!Music
!Dedication
!Result
|-
|Carl & Emily
|23 (7, 8, 8)
|Jive
|"Higher Power" — Coldplay
|His son, Daibhí
|Safe
|-
|Damian & Kylee
|27 (9, 9, 9)
|Contemporary Ballroom
|"Forever Young" — Becky Hill
|''The friends he made on 'Glee|Safe
|-
|Suzanne & Michael
|23 (7, 8, 8)
|Cha-cha-cha
|"Flashdance... What a Feeling" — Irene Cara
|Her parents, Damian & Susan
|Safe
|-
|Shane & Karen
|23 (7, 8, 8)
|Viennese Waltz
|"We Are the Champions" — Queen
|His friend and former teammate, Anthony Foley
|Safe
|-
|Kevin & Laura
|24 (8, 8, 8)
|Paso Doble
|"Smells Like Teen Spirit" — Nirvana
|His daughter, Wallis
|Safe
|-
|Brooke & Robert
|25 (8, 8, 9)
|Viennese Waltz
|"Breakaway" — Kelly Clarkson
|Her mother, Tracy
|Safe
|-
|Stephanie & Ervinas
|23 (7, 8, 8)
|Contemporary Ballroom
|"Fight Song" — Rachel Platten
|Her teammates from the Republic of Ireland women's national football team
|Safe
|-
|*Rory & Denys
|29 (9, 10, 10)
|Paso Doble
|"It's a Sin" — Pet Shop Boys
|His doctor, Prof. Fiona Mulcahy
|Granted immunity
|}
*This week saw Panti Bliss dance out of drag and was referred to as Rory.

Week 7
 Running orderDance-OffJudges' Votes to Save Gourounlian: Suzanne & Michael
 Redmond: Suzanne & Michael
 Barry: Did not vote, but would have voted to save Suzanne & Michael

Week 8: Orchestra Week
All performances this week were accompanied by the RTÉ Concert Orchestra.
Running orderDance-OffJudges' Votes to Save Gourounlian: Panti & Denys
 Redmond: Panti & Denys
 Barry: Did not vote, but would have voted to save Panti & Denys

Week 9: Team Dance Week
Running orderDance-OffJudges' Votes to Save Gourounlian: Brooke & Robert
 Redmond: Brooke & Robert
 Barry: Did not vote and did not infer whom she would have voted to save

Week 10: Fairy Tales Week

Running orderGuest act: Lyra singing her single, 'You'.Dance-OffJudges' Votes to Save'''

 Gourounlian: Suzanne & Michael
 Redmond: Kevin & Laura
 Barry: Suzanne & Michael

Week 11: The Final
Running order

Dance chart 

  Highest scoring dance
  Lowest scoring dance
  No dance performed
  Not performed due to illness or injury
  Immune from elimination

References

External links 

 Official website

Season 06